Caranilla was a genus of moths of the family Noctuidae described by Frederic Moore in 1885; it is now considered a synonym of Buzara, although some species are placed in the genus Bastilla.

References

Holloway, J. D. & Miller, Scott E. (2003). "The composition, generic placement and host-plant relationships of the joviana-group in the Parallelia generic complex". Invertebrate Systematics. 17: 111–128.

Catocalinae